Flörkendorfer Mühlenau is a river of Schleswig-Holstein, Germany.  It flows into the Schwartau near Gleschendorf.

See also
List of rivers of Schleswig-Holstein

References

Rivers of Schleswig-Holstein
Rivers of Germany